The Political Martyrs Monument, located in the Old Calton Burial Ground on Calton Hill, Edinburgh, commemorates five political reformists from the late 18th and early 19th centuries. As part of the Burial Ground it is Category A listed.

Inscriptions
The monument is inscribed on one side:

On another face are quotations from two of the men commemorated on the monument:

History

In 1837 the Radical politician Joseph Hume MP initiated a plan to erect a monument to the five men. Hume chaired a London-based committee to raise public subscriptions in support of the monument and settled on its location being in Edinburgh. In that year the publisher William Tait of Edinburgh wrote on their behalf to the Lord Provost of Edinburgh requesting that land be made available on Calton Hill for this end.

The foundation stone was laid by Hume on 21 August 1844, with 3,000 people gathered for the occasion. The Old Calton Burial Ground, and other parts of Calton Hill, are home to a number of other monuments and memorials. The monument was designed by Thomas Hamilton, who is also responsible for a number of other structures on Calton Hill, including the former Royal High School building and the memorial to Robert Burns.

In February 1852 Hume initiated the erection of a second monument at Nunhead Cemetery in London.

The Martyrs
The five men commemorated—two from Scotland and three from England—were imprisoned for campaigning for parliamentary reform under the influence of the ideals of the French Revolution. Specifically, their support of Palmer's 1793 address that advocated for universal suffrage and annual parliaments was considered incendiary. The five were accused of sedition in a series of trials in 1793 and 1794, and sentenced to terms of penal transportation in the British colony of New South Wales.  All but Gerrald travelled together on the convict transport Surprize; Gerrald left later on the transport Sovereign.

Only Palmer and Margarot served their full 14-year sentences and were released. Palmer remained in New South Wales and established a thriving beer-brewing operation near Sydney Cove; he died of a fever on a trading voyage back to England. Margarot departed the colony when his sentence expired, and was the only one of the five to return to the British Isles.

Muir escaped in early 1796, stowing away aboard an American ship and ultimately making his way to revolutionary France where he died on 26 January 1799. On 16 March 1796 Gerrald died in Port Jackson, from tuberculosis exacerbated by a weakness brought on by excessive drinking. Skirving died three days later from either dysentery or an overdose of laudanum.

References

Bibliography

Category A listed buildings in Edinburgh
Monuments and memorials in Edinburgh
Obelisks in Scotland
Martyrs' monuments and memorials
Calton Hill
Listed monuments and memorials in Scotland